Besh-Tash Lake is a rock-dammed lake in Talas Province of Kyrgyzstan. It is located at the altitude of about 3,000 m in riverbed of Besh-Tash river, left tributary of Talas River.

References 

Lakes of Kyrgyzstan
Mountain lakes